Prunus pumila, commonly called sand cherry, is a North American species of cherry in the rose family. It is widespread in eastern and central Canada from New Brunswick west to Saskatchewan and the northern United States from Maine to Montana, south as far as Colorado, Kansas, Indiana, and Virginia, with a few isolated populations in Tennessee and Utah. It grows in sandy locations such as shorelines and dunes.

It forms dense clonal colonies by sprouts from the root system. They are produced in small clusters of two to four. The fruit is a small cherry  in diameter, ripening to dark purple in early summer.

Varieties
Prunus pumila var. besseyi (Bailey) Gleason, western sand cherry (also called Rocky Mountain cherry)Saskatchewan, Manitoba, western Ontario, south to Colorado and Kansas
Prunus pumila var. depressa (Pursh) Gleason, eastern sand cherryOntario, Québec, New Brunswick south to Pennsylvania
Prunus pumila var. pumila, Great Lakes sand cherryshores of Great Lakes
Prunus pumila var. susquehanae (hort. ex Willd.) Jaeger, Susquehana sand cherryfrom Manitoba east to Maine, south to Tennessee
Prunus × cistena (purple leaf sand cherry) is a hybrid of Prunus cerasifera (cherry plum) and P. pumila. It was developed by Niels Ebbesen Hansen of South Dakota State University in 1910.

Gallery

References

External links
 

pumila
Flora of Canada
Flora of the United States
Plants described in 1767
Taxa named by Carl Linnaeus